Br Lakshmanan was an Indian music director in Malayalam movies during 1950s and 1960s.

Lakshmanan started his career with Aathmasakhi in 1952. He provided music for around 250 Malayalam movie songs.  Lakshmanan's songs were also used in the films Ponkathir, Baalyasakhi and Harishchandra.

Partial filmography

Aathmasakhi 
 Kannikkathiraadum ...
 Aagathamaayitha ...
 Lokame ...
 Jayam Jayam Sthaanajayam ...
 Kaattilaadi ...
 Irumizhi Thannil ...
 Marayukayo Neeyen ...
 Neeye Sharaname ...
 Aa Neelavaanilen ...
 Jala Jala Jal ...
 Mohanam Mohanam ...
 Itho Ho Nin Neethi ...
 Varoo Varoo Sodara ...

Ponkathir 
 Anjana Sreedhara ...
 Aanandavaasam Amaravilaasam ...
 Oh Premamadhuramee ...
 Paadoo Maanasame ...
 Kaliyaadum Poove Varoo ...
 Pranayamohana Swapnam ...
 Sukhame Sukhame ...
 Aanandaroopan ...
 Paarirulmoodi Paathayaake ...
 Ullaasam Ulakellam ...
 Sakalam Vidhiyalle Paaril ...
 Povukanaam ...
 Aashankaathimiram ...

Baalyasakhi 
 Orumayil Ninne ...
 Aananda Jaalangal ...
 En Karalil Kanneriyum ...
 Poomulla Thedi ...

Harishchandra 
Aathmavidyalame...

References

External links

Malayalam film score composers
Indian male composers
Male film score composers